The 2017 Campeón de Campeones was a Mexican football match-up that was played on 16 July 2017 between the champions of the 2016–17 Liga MX season Apertura and Clausura champions, UANL (Apertura 2016 champions) and C.D. Guadalajara (Clausura 2017 champions). Like the previous editions, the 2017 Campeón de Campeones was contested in a single-leg format at a neutral venue in the United States. This year's match took place at the StubHub Center in Carson, California for the second straight year.

The 2017 Campeón de Campeones was part of a doubleheader, which also includes the 2017 Supercopa MX, organized by Univision Deportes, Soccer United Marketing (SUM), Liga MX and LA Galaxy.

Match details

References

Campeón de Campeones
Campeón de Campeones
July 2017 sports events in Mexico